William Martin House may refer to:

William H. Martin House, Hot Springs, Arkansas, listed on the National Register of Historic Places (NRHP)
William C. Martin House, Dalton, Georgia, listed on the NRHP in Whitfield County
Wiliam Martin House, Dundas, Minnesota, listed on the NRHP in Rice County
William Martin House (Brentwood, Tennessee), listed on the NRHP in Williamson County

See also
Martin House (disambiguation)